
Gmina Miłomłyn is an urban-rural gmina (administrative district) in Ostróda County, Warmian-Masurian Voivodeship, in northern Poland.

Villages
Apart from the town of Miłomłyn, Gmina Miłomłyn contains the villages and settlements of Bagieńsko, Boguszewo, Bynowo, Dębinka, Faltyjanki, Gil Mały, Gil Wielki, Glimy, Kamieńczyk, Karnitki, Karnity, Ligi, Liksajny, Liwa, Lubień, Majdany Małe, Majdany Wielkie, Malinnik, Ostrów Wielki, Piławki, Rogowo, Skarpa, Skułty, Tarda, Wielimowo, Winiec, Wólka Majdańska, Zalewo, Zatoka Leśna and Ziemaki.

Neighbouring gminas
Gmina Miłomłyn is bordered by the gminas of Iława, Łukta, Małdyty, Morąg, Ostróda and Zalewo.

References
Polish official population figures 2006

Milomlyn
Ostróda County